Farrukh Fateh Ali Khan (December 25, 1952 – September 7, 2003) was a Pakistani musician, who played the harmonium in Qawwali music. He was also a member of a well-known family of Qawwali musicians, the Qawwal Bacchon gharana (Delhi gharana), he was the younger brother of Nusrat Fateh Ali Khan, the son of Fateh Ali Khan, the nephew of Mubarak Ali Khan, and the father of Rahat Fateh Ali Khan.

Biography
Nusrat Fateh Ali Khan was the leader of the family Qawwali party from 1971 until his death in 1997. Farrukh Fateh Ali Khan was one of only two people who remained members of the party throughout this period. Farrukh played the lead harmonium, and provided accompanying vocals. His talent to play in all scales and his ability to switch a tune at a moment's notice are arguably the best in his profession. While accompanying Nusrat to England, he became widely known as Harmonium Raja Sahib (King of the Harmonium).

His talents and accomplishments often went unrecognized due to playing in the shadow of Nusrat. In an interview to the Pakistan Television in 1989, Nusrat revealed that very often the tunes of the qawwalis sung by the party were composed by Farrukh. He is credited as such in some of the albums by the group, such as Shahenshah.

He remained a member of the party when his son, Rahat Fateh Ali Khan, took over the leadership of the party after Nusrat's death in 1997. Farrukh Fateh Ali Khan died on September 7, 2003.

Farrukh, Nusrat & Rahat
Both Farrukh and Rahat often accompanied Nusrat and were a part of his team. They carried forward Nusrat's legacy after his death in 1997. Farrukh and Rahat made their Bollywood debut together for the 2003 film Paap, which released a few months after Farrukh's death.

See also
 Harmonium
 List of Pakistani qawwali singers
 Qawwali
 Nusrat Fateh Ali Khan
 Rahat Fateh Ali Khan

References

External links
Farrukh Fateh Ali Khan on IMDb website

2003 deaths
Musicians from Faisalabad
20th-century Pakistani male singers
Pakistani qawwali singers
Harmonium players
1952 births
Farrukh